Yvonne Jonsson (died July 1, 2005) was a 19-year-old Swedish woman living in Sri Lanka at the time of her murder. She was beaten and fatally strangled by Jude Shramantha Anthony Jayamaha in the stairwell of the Royal Park Condominium complex in Rajagiriya, Sri Lanka. Despite sustaining major blunt force cranial trauma, the cause of death was asphyxiation by either ligature or manual strangulation.

Jonsson's murder case, often appearing in media as the Royal Park Murder, was highly publicised. It later received further public attention in 2019 due Jayamaha's receipt of a presidential pardon issued by then President Maithripala Sirisena. Jayamaha expressed remorse for the murder in an open letter shortly after his pardon.

Background

Yvonne Jonsson 

Yvonne Jonsson was born on August15, 1985 to Swedish national Roger Jonsson and Sri Lankan Chamalka (née Saparamadu) Jonsson.

Along with her sister and Jayamaha, Yvonne attended Colombo International School for the duration of her primary and secondary education, after which she emigrated to the  United States of America to study fashion design.

Jude Shramantha Anthony Jayamaha 

Jude Shramantha Jayamaha was born in 1985 to Preethi Jayamaha and Sandra (née Jennifer) Jayamaha, a wealthy family. His parents' marriage began to grow unstable a year after his birth, and in 1996 they divorced. After the divorce, Jayamaha lived with his father on Bagatalle Road.

Jayamaha had attended Wycherly International School, Colombo International School and ACBT, and according to his father he had been home on vacation from his higher education in Australia at the time of the murder.

He was engaged in a romantic relationship with Caroline Jonsson, Yvonne's younger sister, at the time of Yvonne's murder. As evidenced by her conversations with her mother while she was in the States, Yvonne had been acquainted with Jayamaha's behaviour; she strongly cautioned her mother against letting Caroline enter a relationship with him. In spite of this, the relationship between seventeen-year-old Caroline and nineteen-year-old Jayamaha grew.

In his adolescence, Jayamaha displayed signs of aberrant and rebellious behaviour. Testifying before the Colombo Additional Magistrate, Caroline alleged that Jayamaha had made a Colombo International School student pregnant and had been previously suspended for bringing narcotics to the school. She also continued with their relationship despite being aware of Jayamaha's numerous other girlfriends.

Discovery and arrest 

Yvonne's body was discovered by Shelia Anthony, a domestic aide, at 9:30a.m. on the morning of July1, 2005, in the stairwell of the Royal Park Condominium complex in Rajagiriya. Anthony's employer requested that she deliver some items to a tenant on the 19thfloor, whereupon Anthony came across the body lying on the steps. Anthony alerted Chandrapala Wanasinghe, the manager of the apartment complex, who identified the body. About the body, Wanasinghe noted: "The body looked like that of a doll. I later managed to identify the body as that of Roger Jonsson’s daughter Yvonne. Her jeans had been pulled down to her ankles and wrapped around her neck."

Jayamaha was arrested on the evening of July2 at the Jonsson's condominium, where he had been among the aggrieved Jonsson family and Yvonne's friends.

Trial, conviction and reconstruction of events 

After his arrest, Jayamaha was indicted in the High Court of Colombo for the murder of Yvonne Jonsson, for the offence defined in section294 of the Penal Code, and was tried before a Judge sitting without a jury. He was found guilty of culpable homicide on July28, 2006, but not murder. He was convicted and sentenced to 12years of rigorous imprisonment and was levied a fine of 300,000Sri Lankan rupees.

The prosecution, through investigation and forensic data, were able to determine the progression of events surrounding Yvonne's murder.

Night before the murder 

On June30, 2005, at 8:30p.m., Yvonne and Caroline arranged to pick up Jayamaha from his residence in Bagatale Road in Roger Jonsson's vehicle, in preparation for a night of bar-hopping. The group travelled back and forth between the White Horse Inn, located on Nawam Mawatha, a bar known as Glow, located in the building of the Automobile Association of Ceylon, and The Blue Elephant at the Hilton Colombo.

They were at various points accompanied by friends studying at Colombo International, and in the latter part of the night a Korean friend of the Jonsson family known as Khone. The four then returned to the Hilton, where they remained for only 10minutes before reclaiming Yvonne's car from the valet. Caroline alleges that at some point during the night she and Jayamaha had argued, after which Yvonne blamed Caroline's emotional distress on Jayamaha. However, Jayamaha's legal counsel maintained that the argument had begun over Caroline talking to an individual named Pavithra, and that Yvonne had taken Jayamaha's side.

Yvonne and Khone returned to Glow shortly thereafter. Caroline and Jayamaha hired a cab and returned to the Jonsson's condominium in Royal Park, arriving at 2:02a.m. on the morning of July1st. Upon arriving in her parents' condominium on the 23rdfloor, Caroline misinformed her parents that she had returned with Yvonne. Caroline and Jayamaha then briefly stayed in Caroline's room, where Caroline made a phone call to Khone to inquire about Yvonne. Jayamaha maintains that he and Caroline had sex in her bedroom, whereas Caroline alleges that she and Jayamaha had quarrelled again. Jayamaha hired a taxi over his phone before leaving the condominium between 2:202:30a.m.

Murder of Yvonne Jonsson 

Yvonne returned to the Royal Park Condominium complex at 2:50a.m.

The prosecution found evidence to suggest the attack began after Yvonne exited the elevator on the 23rdfloor. Jayamaha allegedly forced Yvonne to the staircase, leading Yvonne to drop articles of clothing belonging to her in the ensuing struggle. Jayamaha forcibly bashed her head against the edge of a step several times, leading to her skull being fractured into over 60pieces.

Yvonne had been dragged down four flights of stairs; her body was found on the stairs of the 19thfloor. Cause of death, according to a medial officer, was asphyxiation by a pair of stretch pants worn by the deceased. According to the prosecution Jayamaha had fashioned them into a ligature by bending the victim's legs backwards.

A partial palm impression in blood matching Jayamaha was found on the banister near Yvonne's body.

After the murder 

Jayamaha confessed to bathing in the pool at Royal Park after the murder, in order to wash off the blood and matter that had accumulated on his body and hands and in his hair.

Jayamaha's taxi arrived between 3:253:30a.m., along with his friend, Shafraz Rilvan Mohamed. The driver of the taxi and Mohamed later independently testified that Jayamaha appeared dressed only in a pair of boxer shorts and shirt, carrying a pair of folded trousers, with no visible blood on his person.

Caroline alleged that after the morning of July1st, Jayamaha deviated from his habitual and frequent contact with her. She received no phone calls from him for the next one and a half days, despite usually receiving several calls from him daily. Jayamaha also did not visit Caroline until the 2nd of July.

Failed appeal and death sentence 

Jayamaha submitted for appeal on September21, 2011 and July22, 2012, and in response the Attorney General petitioned for an increase in his sentencing, from rigorous imprisonment to capital punishment by way of finding Jayamaha guilty of murder, reversing the original conviction of culpable homicide.

The matter of appeal was presided by judges W. L. Ranjith Silva and Nalin Perera, and argued on March16, March19 and May3, 2012. Both appeals from Jayamaha and the Attorney General were disposed by a "single judgement common to both appeals, binding on both parties."

During the proceedings, both the prosecution and appellant's counsel revisited facts, evidence and testimony from the 2006 case.

The case for the defense 

The counsel for the appellant began its case by attempting to establish the absence of enmity or conflict between Jayamaha and Yvonne prior to the murder.

Jayamaha's counsel then made the argument that the palm print found at the scene of the crime had not been definitively matched to Jayamaha. Thus, the entire case was based on circumstantial evidence and could not be tied to Jayamaha without first eliminating the possibility of another individual having committed the crime.

His counsel also made the argument that, of all the personal effects found dropped near the scene of the crime, none of them belonged to Jayamaha. Further, sputum samples found at the scene of the crime which were forensically analysed found no match to Jayamaha, and the pair of shoes purported to have been worn by Jayamaha bore no trace of blood that would have been unavoidable had Jayamaha passed the bleeding body on the stairwell.

The judge found that since the crime scene had already been visited multiple times before the police had been notified, the sputum samples had no effect on the culpability of the appellant. The judge also observed that the pair of boots that were tested had been voluntarily surrendered by Jayamaha and had not been recovered by police.

Evidence submitted during the appeal hearing suggested that Jayamaha had been intoxicated. The determination to which degree Jayamaha had been intoxicated was instrumental in reversing the judgement of culpable homicide.

Sentenced to death 
The presiding judge, reviewing the actions and precautions that Jayamaha undertook during and shortly after Yvonne's murder, found that they did not fit the judgement of culpable homicide. The judge noted that the meticulous thought that went into Jayamaha's actions, such as bathing in the pool at Royal park and disposing of his bloodied apparel, was conducive of a presence of mind that an extremely intoxicated individual would not have had.

Ultimately, the judge found Jayamaha guilty of murder and increased his sentence to death.

The sentencing was upheld by the Supreme Court in 2014 after Jayamaha appealed it once again.

Presidential pardon 

On November 9, 2019, Jude Shramantha Jayamaha was granted a presidential pardon by Maithripala Sirisena during his last week in office. Jayamaha was discharged from Kuruvita Prison, where he had been incarcerated since 2012, the same day.

In a press release from the President's Media Division, it was stated that the pardon had been granted based on the recommendations of Buddhist religious leaders Ven Rathana Thero, Ven Baddegama Samitha Thero and Ven Dr Keradewala Punnarathana Nayake Thero.

Jayamaha's open letter 

On November 14, 2019, shortly after his release from Kuruwita Prison, Jayamaha penned an open letter addressed to the public of Sri Lanka.

In this letter, Jayamaha deemed his behaviour during his youth a product of his unstable childhood.

In part of his letter specifically addressed to the Jonsson family, Jayamaha expresses his remorse and grief for having killed Yvonne, and his desire to "keep on trying to make amends".

Part of Jayamaha's letter is also reserved for addressing societal concerns towards his release. He states that his higher education and attainment of a BSc in Economics from the London School of Economics, an MSc in Business from the Open University of Sri Lanka and the approaching completion of his PhD attests to a change in his behaviour.

Jayamaha closed his letter with a brief timeline of his incarceration, as well as a plea to give him a second chance.

Reactions and controversy 

The presidential pardon was deemed "an illegal and unjustifiable move by President Maithripala Sirisena" by JVP leader and presidential candidate Anura Kumara Dissanayake.

2019 presidential candidate Sajith Premadasa promised to overturn the pardon if elected.

The President's Media Unit also claimed that Reverend Raymond Wickramasinghe, the Bishop of Galle, had written to endorse the pardon for Jayamaha. On November 11, 2019, Reverend Wickramasinghe issued a statement in which he clarified the endorsement, made a few years prior to the pardon, had advocated for the general rehabilitation of prisoners and did not specifically mention Jayamaha.

Yvonne's sister, Caroline Jonsson, has publicly spoken out against the pardon, noting that Jayamaha "shows no remorse".

Notes

References

Sources 

 
 
 
 
 
 
 
 
 
 
 
 
 
 
 
 
 
 

Jonsson, Yvonne
Jonsson, Yvonne
Jonsson, Yvonne
Jonsson, Yvonne
Jonsson, Yvonne
Jonsson, Yvonne
Jonsson, Yvonne
Jonsson, Yvonne
Violence against women in Sri Lanka